David O'Brien (born 24 January 1984 in Stirling) is a Scottish former professional footballer who plays as a left-sided midfielder, for home-town side Stirling University. He has also played for Stirling Albion, Dundee and Ayr United.

Career
O'Brien started his career with Stirling Albion in 2001, after joining from amateur side Denny Amateurs, and helped them win the Second Division play-off final against Airdrie United in 2007.  In January 2007, he signed a pre-contract agreement with Dundee, moving to Tayside in May 2007. At the end of the 2007–08 season, he signed a one-year contract extension with the Dens Park side. He failed to have his contract renewed when it expired in 2009.

On 15 June 2009, Ayr United announced that they had signed O'Brien. He left the Honest Men on 3 August 2009, after not being selected to play against his old club Stirling Albion on 1 August 2009. O'Brien met with the manager Brian Reid, and after a short discussion he left the club.

He rejoined his home-town team, Stirling Albion, on 6 August 2009.

After his contract expired at Stirling, he joined manager Allan Moore at new club Greenock Morton. O'Brien signed on for another season in May 2012. He again signed a one-year deal in May 2013. He left Morton in the summer of 2014 after failing to recover from an injury sustained at Celtic Park.

In August 2016, he signed for Junior side Camelon Juniors where he stayed for a season before signing for Stirling University.

Honours
Stirling Albion
Scottish Football League Second Division 
Winners 2009–10

See also
Greenock Morton F.C. season 2010–11 | 2011–12 | 2012–13 | 2013–14

References

External links

Living people
1984 births
Scottish footballers
Stirling Albion F.C. players
Dundee F.C. players
Footballers from Stirling
Ayr United F.C. players
Scottish Football League players
Association football wingers
Greenock Morton F.C. players
Scottish Professional Football League players
Camelon Juniors F.C. players
University of Stirling F.C. players
Scottish Junior Football Association players